This is a list of the last monarchs in the Americas.

North America

United States 
The Native American hereditary leaders during this time are not included. Those that are listed as former monarchs of what is now the continental United States were heads of European seated monarchies (or Mexican monarchs, such as Agustín I of Mexico and Maximilian I of Mexico) and themselves never set foot on American soil. Others were indigenous monarchs, such as Malietoa Tanumafili I, Tuʻi Manuʻa Elisala and Liliuokalani of Hawaii; The last monarch of each state and territory may not be the last colonial ruler (i.e. Louis XV is the last French monarch of Louisiana, but Napoleon Bonaparte, prior to becoming Emperor, was the last ruler of Louisiana). Also their end of reign may not be how the US acquired these states. One state can have more than one last monarch, since each state may have been the product of many different acquisitions by the United States. Different claims of a foreign country are taken into account.

By states

By territories

South America

See also 
 Monarchies in the Americas
 List of the last monarchs in Europe
 Emperor Norton

References 

Americas-related lists
Last Americas
History of the Americas
History-related lists of superlatives